Dictyonema hirsutum is a species of basidiolichen in the family Hygrophoraceae. Found in the páramo region near Bogotá at over  elevation, it was described as new to science in 2011.

References

hirsutum
Lichen species
Páramo fungi
Lichens of Colombia
Altiplano Cundiboyacense
Lichens described in 2011
Taxa named by Robert Lücking